Jamie McMann (born July 20, 1976) is an American record producer, mixer, and audio engineer, currently based in Rochester, New York, United States.

Biography
Jamie McMann has produced recordings spanning multiple genres of music professionally since 2002 when he began working at San Francisco's historic Hyde Street Studios.  
After a four-year run with Hyde Street Studios, McMann moved on to produce a significant body of work out of Motor Studios, San Francisco, (owned by Fat Mike, bassist and frontman of the punk rock band NOFX).  Utilizing a 64 channel SSL4000E (analog audio console), McMann shaped numerous productions that were released on Fat Mike's record label, Fat Wreck Chords. McMann has recently relocated to Los Angeles where he continues to produce records for various artists and record labels.

Select discography
Mandrake – The Shell Corporation (2014) Mixing
Stuck in a Circle – Swingin' Utters (2013) Producer, engineer
Panic State – D-Cent Jerks (2013) Producer, Mixing, engineer
Poorly Formed	–       Swingin' Utters	   (2013) Engineer, producer
Stoke Extinguisher	- NOFX	              (2013) EngineerShe's an Alarm – One Man Army (2012) Engineer, mixingAcoustic, Vol. 2	– Joey Cape, Tony Sly	       (2012) Engineer, mixing, producerSelf Entitled	–        NOFX	    (2012) EngineerTime and Pressure – The Shell Corporation (2012) Producer, mixing, engineerThe Decline, Live DVD – NOFX (2012) MixerRubber Bordello – Original Soundtrack (2012) Producer, engineer, mixingAgitations	      –  Cobra Skulls	   (2011) Engineer, mixing, producerFrom The Dumpster to the Grave – Leftöver Crack (2011) Producer, engineerForce Majeure – The Shell Corporation (2011) Production, Mixing, engineerGo Down Under	–  Me First and the Gimme Gimmes	(2011) Engineer, mixing, producerHere, Under Protest – Swingin' Utters	(2011) Engineer, mixing, producerSad Bear	  –      Tony Sly	  (2011) Engineer, mixing, producerBringing the War Home – Cobra Skulls (2010) Producer, engineer, mixing12 Song Program	– Tony Sly	 (2010) Engineer, mixing, producerConsentual Selections	– Mad Caddies	(2010) EngineerThe Longest EP	   –     NOFX	   (2010) Engineer, mixingAfrican Elephants –	Dead to Me    (2009) Engineer, mixingCoaster	    –    NOFX (2009) EngineerCokie the Clown – NOFX	 (2009) Engineer, mixingLet Them Know: The Story of Youth Brigade & BYO Records (2009)  EngineerHatest Grits: B-Sides and Bullshit	– Swingin' Utters (2008)  RemixingHave Another Ball! – Me First and the Gimme Gimmes (2008)  RemixingI Think My Older Brother Used to Listen to Lagwagon –	  Lagwagon	(2008) Accordion (diatonic), engineer, mixing, producerLittle Brother –	         Dead to Me      (2008) Engineer, assistant producerOff the Leash –	         The Real McKenzies	  (2008) Engineer, mixing, producerRe-Volts	    –     Re-Volts	          (2008) MixingRemain in Memory: The Final Show –	Good Riddance (2008)	  Engineer, producerUntil We're Dead –	Star Fucking Hipsters	(2008) Engineer, mixingA Different Light –	Sherwood	    (2007) Engineer, vocalsDeadline   –    Leftöver Crack	 (2007) Engineer, mixing, producerThey've Actually Gotten Worse Live –	NOFX (2007)	          Engineer, mixingI Remember When I Was Pretty –	 Playing Favorites	   (2007) EngineerHasta La Muerte! – La Plebe (2006) Engineer, mixingLove Their Country –	 Me First and the Gimme Gimmes (2006)	  EngineerMy Republic	–         Good Riddance	  (2006) EngineerSeize the Time! –	 Flattbush	        (2006) EngineerTwelve Small Steps, One Giant Disappointment	– Bad Astronaut (2006) Additional mixingWolves in Wolves' Clothing –	NOFX	(2006) Additional engineerThrasher Mag: Skate Rock, Vol. 12: Eat the Flag'' – various artists  (2005)       Engineer, mixing

Other sources
2014: Discogs.
1997–2014: Barnesandnoble.com LLC.
1997–2014: Rogue Digital, LLC.
2012: Snakeoil Media Productions, LLC.

References

External links
Jamie McMann official website
Hyde Street Studios official website
Fat Wreck Chords official website

1976 births
Living people
Record producers from New York (state)
Businesspeople from Rochester, New York
Fat Wreck Chords artists
Adeline Records artists
Epitaph Records artists
BYO Records artists